Ernst Johnny Hellström (9 December 1941 – 16 January 1962) was a Swedish diver. He competed in the men's 3 metre springboard event at the 1960 Summer Olympics.

References

External links
 

1941 births
1962 deaths
Swedish male divers
Olympic divers of Sweden
Divers at the 1960 Summer Olympics
Sportspeople from Jönköping
20th-century Swedish people